Sacred Arias may refer to:

 Sacred Arias (Andrea Bocelli album)
 Sacred Arias (Katherine Jenkins album)